Marur is a village in Raptadu Mandal, Anantapur, a district in the Rayalaseema region of Andhra Pradesh, India. It is located near National Highway 44 and includes a large toll plaza called the Maruru Toll Plaza. The village is made up of different minorities including Valmikis, Reddys, Kurubas, and Nadians.

Marur is well known for its intellectuals. Kondapalli Balamuddanna, who was awarded with the best teacher award in Raptadu Mandal, was born here. Many other teachers, lawyers, and professionals come from the village.

The village is also known as a religious center with many sacred temples in and around the village. The village is known for the Sri Chinna Kadirayya Swamy temple. Every Saturday, a festival atmosphere develops near the temple as people from distant places come to worship.

References 

Villages in Anantapur district